Antiguan and Barbudan Creole, often called Creole, "Local dialect", or simply Antiguan and Barbudan is an English-based creole language consisting of several varieties spoken in the Leeward Islands, namely the countries of Antigua and Barbuda, Saint Kitts and Nevis and the British territories of Anguilla and Montserrat.

There are subtle differences in the language's usage by different speakers, and islanders often use it in combination with Standard English. The tendency to switch back and forth from Creole to Standard English often seems to correlate with the class status of the speaker. Persons of higher social status tend to switch between Standard English and Creole more readily, due to their more extensive formal education in the English-language school system. Creole usage is more common, and is less similar to Standard English, as speakers descend the socioeconomic ladder.  This  is an example of a Creole continuum.

Many Creole words are derived from English or African origins. The creole was formed when slaves owned by English planters imitated the English of their enslavers but pronounced it with their own inflections. This can be easily seen in phrases such as "", meaning "I am not going", or in "", presumably a cognate of "Ain't it?"

Vocabulary

Vocabulary is widely based on British vocabulary, due to centuries of association with Great Britain. Examples:

 Bonnet refers to the hood of a car.
 Chips refers to what in American English is called French Fries. However, fries is commonly used as well.
 Form is used instead of the American high school grade. (7th Grade-1st Form; 11th Grade-5th Form)
 Patty for flaky folded pastry, unlike the American patty, meaning hamburger patty.
 Mongrel is used instead of the US mutt.
 Biscuit is used instead of the US cookie.

However, in other cases the American form prevails over the British one, due to the islands' close proximity to the United States:

 Apartment is used instead of the British flat.
 Elevator instead of the British lift.
 parking lot instead of car park.

Because of the influx of other Caribbean nationals to Antigua, due to natural migration and to the CSME, Antigua's everyday vocabulary is being influenced by Jamaican Creole, Bajan Creole, Guyanese Creole and Trinidadian Creole. This is even more common among the youth. Examples:

 Yute and star meaning young man.
 Breda (derived from Brethren and Partner) meaning close friend.
 Sell off meaning excellent or very good.

Pronunciation

Antiguan is pronounced very similarly to Jamaican. This has led some to surmise that the slaves of these countries came from the same place in Africa. Below are a few ways in which some language blends are fused or changed completely.

 "TR" as in 'Truck' is pronounced "CH", thus: 'Chruck.'
 "DR" as in 'Dress' is pronounced" J", thus: 'Jess'
 "TH" as in 'Them' is pronounced "D", thus: 'Dem'
 "TH" as in 'Think' is pronounced "T", thus: 'Tink'
 "WN" as in 'Down' is pronounced "NG", thus: 'Dung'
 "V" as in 'Vex' is pronounced "B", thus: 'Bex'
 Sometimes an ending "T" is left off and words such as 'Best' sound like 'Bess'. Expect sounds like 'Expeck'; and 'Left' sounds like 'Leff'.

Phrases 

 "You giee way you gut, an tek trash tuff um"

Sociohistorical influence 
Antiguan and Barbudan Creole first emerged during the 18th century as an English-lexifer Creole. While it thus adopted many features of the English language everything from the creole's lexicon to its phonology reflects Antigua's more nuanced history. 

The English arrived in Antigua in 1632 from neighboring St. Kitts upon which the first European establishment was founded on the island. Throughout the seventeenth century there was resistance to the use of slave labour due to the widespread belief that there was merit in laboring for one's self. However, as the island shifted from a subsistence economy to a more commercial one, the demand for labourers took off. This was met with indentured servants hailing primarily from Southern England and Scotland (following the 1707 Act of Union), as well as imported slaves. Around the same time, in 1674, Colonel Christopher Codrington, emigrated from Barbados to Antigua and established the island's first sugar plantation. This marked the beginning of what was to become the pinnacle of the island's economy until the late 18th century. And as the plantation economy grew, so did the desire for cheap labor. This is displayed in the monumental shift in the number of slaves on the island, from 41.6% of the population in 1672 to 90.2% merely 40 years later. Initially, these slaves were imported from the Bights of Benin and Biafra. There, the majority of the population spoke Delto-Benuic languages such as Igbo and Duala. However, in the early 1700s more slaves were imported to Antigua from the Gold Coast than from any other part of Africa. This was short-lived and soon after the Bights of Benin and Biafra overtook the Gold Coast in exportation of slaves to Antigua. 

This is all to say that Antiguan Creole, was conceived against the backdrop of a plethora of different languages and cultures, all of which have influenced this Creole. Words and syntax of Igbo origin like "eddoes" the Igbo word for "taro," and their second-person plural "unu" are widespread while English lexicon while at the end of the day, it evolved from the English of the island's colonizers in conjunction with substrate languages of West African origin.

Language use

Antiguan Creole is used in almost every aspect of life in Antigua. In all schools, during class hours, it is required of students to speak Standard English. This policy is especially exercised in private owned schools. Most media and mainstream communication is written and spoken in Standard English, although Antiguan Creole is sometimes used humorously or as a way of identifying with the local public.

Use of Antiguan Creole varies depending on socio-economic class. In general, the higher and middle classes use it amongst friends and family but switch to Standard English in the public sphere. The lower class tend to use Antiguan Creole in almost every sector of life. Part of this discrepancy dates back to the Creole's inception. Ever since Antiguan Creole first came into existence it was used as a means to identify with a given group. For example, as more slaves entered the island, indentured servants and slaves had less contact with white plantation owners as the economy moved to a larger-scale. While these two groups interacted and a Creole emerged as the two groups had to communicate and interact, indentured servants tried to speak the 'Standard English' with increased frequency in order to associate with people at the top of the hierarchy for whom 'Standard English' was the norm. Conversely, for slaves, speaking the Creole was a symbol of identity.

Pronominal system

 The pronominal system of Standard English has a four-way distinction of person, singular/plural, gender and nominative/objective. Some varieties of Antiguan Creole do not have the gender or nominative/objective distinction, though most do; but usefully, it does distinguish between the second person singular and plural (you).

I, me = me;
you, you (thou, thee) = yu;
he, him = he;
she, her = she; 
we, us = ah-we;
they, them = dem;

To form the possessive form of the pronoun add "fu-" to the above. However, the pronoun "our" is an exception where we add "ar-".

my, mine = fu-mi;
your, yours (thy, thine) = fu-yu;
his, his = fu-he;
her, hers = fu-she;
our, ours = ah-we;
you all = ah-yu;
their, theirs = fu-dem

Example:
 a fu-yu daag dat?, is that your dog?
 a fu-yu daag dat day nuh, that is your dog.

See also

Nigerian Pidgin English
Krio language

References

Languages of Antigua and Barbuda
English-based pidgins and creoles
English language in the Caribbean
Creoles of the Caribbean
Languages of the African diaspora